Knight Squad is an American comedy television series created by Sean Cunningham and Marc Dworkin that aired on Nickelodeon from February 19, 2018 to April 20, 2019. The series stars Owen Joyner, Daniella Perkins, Lilimar, Lexi DiBenedetto, Amarr M. Wooten, Savannah May, and Kelly Perine.

Premise 
At a "magical school for knights in training" in the kingdom of Astoria, two very different students, Arc and Ciara, form a pact to keep each other's secrets and to follow their dreams of knighthood. Arc and Ciara train with their classmates Prudence and Warwick as well as their rivals Sage and Buttercup so that they would one day be knights and defend Astoria from various threats like its ex-king Ryker and his army.

Cast and characters

Main 
 Owen Joyner as Arc, a drifter from Seagate who cheats and steals his way into the knight school and on to the Phoenix Squad so that he can one day liberate his homeland of Seagate from Ryker.
 Daniella Perkins as Ciara, a student who is secretly the princess of Astoria who wears a special ring given to her by pixies at Eliza's suggestion to disguise herself so that she can secretly attend knight school and be a part of Phoenix Squad
 Lilimar as Sage, a student at the school who is Ciara's rival and a member of Kraken Squad. In "Closing Knight," Sage's motivation for becoming a knight was when she at a young age was unable to do anything when the Queen of Astoria was taken by tree goblins.
 Lexi DiBenedetto as Prudence, a student who is "one-quarter giant" that is in Phoenix Squad with Arc, Ciara and Warwick. Between the end of season one and the beginning of season two, Prudence learns the secrets of Arc and the Princess as she agrees to keep quiet to keep both of them from being in trouble with the King and Sir Gareth.
 Amarr M. Wooten as Warwick, a student who is in Phoenix Squad with Arc, Ciara and Prudence, and who is considered to be the worst knight student in the school, but who later discovers that he can do magic; he is the older brother of Fizzwick; In "Love at First Knight," Warwick learns the secrets of Arc and the Princess.
 Savannah May as Buttercup, a sweet and cheerful student at the school who is Sage's minion and a member of Kraken Squad
 Kelly Perine as Sir Gareth, a knight with an eye patch, a metal left arm, and a metal left butt cheek who is a teacher at knight school

Recurring 
 Jason Sim-Prewitt as The King, the unnamed ruler of Astoria the very protective father of the Princess and Princess Eliza
 Seth Carr as Fizzwick, Warwick's younger brother who does odd jobs around knight school
 Fred Grandy as Wizard Hogancross, the greatest wizard in the land who serves the King, has a poor relationship with Sir Gareth, and was the creator of the force field that keeps Ryker out of Astoria

Todd Tucker also voices Slobwick, a furry creature who first appears in "A Thief in the Knight".

Notable guest stars 
 Mary Passeri as Sorceress Spitzalot, the headmistress of Astoria's magic school who is willing to accept anyone with magical abilities.
 Tenzing Norgay Trainor as Jimbo, a former Phoenix Squad member
 Maria Canals-Barrera as Saffron, a potion maker and Sage's mother
 Jaheem Toombs as Sebastian, a student at Sorcery School
 Maya Le Clark as Brea, a girl who is educated by Sage
 Kira Kosarin as Kiki, a genie
 Jack Griffo as Sir Swayze, a knight and ex-student of Sir Gareth who became a knight in the kingdom of Inwood since anyone who lives in Inwood can become a knight
 Garrett Morris as Old Fizzwick, the elderly form of Fizzwick
 Geno Segers as Ryker, the former king of Astoria who was exiled for his corruption and leads an army with the intention to reclaim it while destroying some villages along the way
 Lizzy Greene as Shadow Ghost, a ghost who targeted the Princess
 Sydney Park as Princess Eliza, the older sister of the Princess who procured a special ring for her sister and led her father's army in fighting Ryker until she fell under the control of the Mark of Ryker spell
 Chris Tallman as The Wiper
 Raini Rodriguez as The Witch Doctor

Production 
Knight Squad received a 20-episode order from Nickelodeon in May 2017. Production on the series began in October 2017, and it premiered in February 2018. Tenzing Norgay Trainor has appeared on the series, playing Jimbo in the episode "The Dork Knight Returns". On July 27, 2018, the series was renewed for a second season of 10 episodes.

Episodes

Series overview

Season 1 (2018–19)

Season 2 (2019)

Ratings 
 
                      
| link2             = #Season 2 (2019)
| episodes2         = 10
| start2            = 
| end2              = 
| startrating2      = 0.81
| endrating2        = 0.52
| viewers2          = |2}} 
}}

References

External links 
 

2010s American children's comedy television series
2010s Nickelodeon original programming
2018 American television series debuts
2019 American television series endings
English-language television shows